Jiaozhou North is a railway station found on the boundary between Jiaodong Subdistrict and Jiaolai Town of Jiaozhou, Qingdao, Shandong, China. It currently is on the Qingdao–Jinan high-speed railway and Qingdao–Jinan passenger railway.

History
Construction was approved by the Ministry of Railways in June 2006, and construction began in November 2008.  Train service began on January 11, 2011, with four trains, two towards Jinan and two towards Qingdao.

Service
Before reconstruction, the station offered trains to Qingdao and Jinan, as well as trains to Beijing and Shanghai.  Out of the ten trains that enter the station, nine of them are China Railway High-speed trains (designated by "D" and "G"), while the last is a "Common-Fast" train (designated by "K") originating from Dandong.

In 2016, the station is temporarily closed for construction of tracks and platforms for the Qingdao-Jinan high-speed railway. It was reopened in 2018, along with the opening of the new high-speed railway.

Qingdao Metro

Jiaozhou North Railway Station is a station on Line 8 of the Qingdao Metro. It opened on 24 December 2020. It is located in Licang District and it serves Jiaozhou North railway station.

Gallery

References

Railway stations in Shandong
Railway stations in China opened in 2011
Stations on the Qingdao–Taiyuan High-Speed Railway
Stations on the Qingdao–Jinan passenger railway